Yadil Orestes Mujica Díaz (born January 1, 1985) is a Cuban professional baseball player for the Rojos de Caborca of the Liga Norte de México. He defected from Cuba and plays in minor league baseball.

Career
Mujica played for Matanzas of the Cuban National Series. He was left off of the Cuban national baseball team roster for the 2008 Olympics. Though he was listed on the provisional roster for the 2009 World Baseball Classic, he did not make the tournament's final roster.

Mujica defected to the United States. He played for the Class AA Trenton Thunder of the Eastern League in 2011 and was promoted to the Class AAA Scranton/Wilkes-Barre Yankees of the International League in 2012. After receiving three plate appearances in three games for Scranton/Wilkes-Barre, Mujica was reassigned to the Thunder. He was named the Eastern League's Offensive Player of the Week for the week ending April 29, in which he batted 10-for-18 with six runs scored and a .600 on-base percentage.

Mujica played for the Cuban national team at the 2023 World Baseball Classic.

See also

List of baseball players who defected from Cuba

References

External links

Living people
1985 births
Sportspeople from Matanzas
Defecting Cuban baseball players
Tampa Yankees players
Trenton Thunder players
Scranton/Wilkes-Barre Yankees players
2023 World Baseball Classic players
Cuban expatriate baseball players in the United States